Edwin Craig (born July 10, 1937) is an actor who has played supporting roles in many Hollywood films. His most notable role was as the gangster "Rotelli" in the Tim Burton film Batman. He says the line, "What's with that stupid grin?" before the Joker kills him. He is the son of an Italian-American actress, Adele Craig.

Filmography

References

External links
 

1937 births
American people of Italian descent
American male film actors
Living people